The Communist Party of Ukraine  ( Komunistychna Partiya Ukrayiny, КПУ, KPU) was the founding and ruling political party of the Ukrainian Soviet Socialist Republic operated as a republican branch (union republics) of the Communist Party of the Soviet Union (CPSU). No decision of the government of Ukraine (Council of Ministers) was adopted without approval of the Central Committee of the Communist Party of Ukraine. The Communist Party of Ukraine is not one and the same party as the Ukrainian Communist Party or Ukrainian Communist Party (Borotbists).

Founded as the Communist Party (Bolsheviks) of Ukraine (CP(b)U) in 1918 in Moscow, Russian SFSR, it was the sole governing party in Ukraine. While the Ukrainian People's Republic had its own political parties of communist ideologies, the Communist Party of Ukraine was created out of the party of Russian Bolsheviks in Ukraine known as the RSDRP(b) – Social-Democracy of Ukraine. In 1952 it became the Communist Party of Ukraine.

According to the CPU statute it was organized on the basis of democratic centralism, a principle conceived by Vladimir Lenin that entails democratic and open discussion of policy issues within the party followed by the requirement of total unity in upholding the agreed policies. The CPU's highest body was the Party Congress, which convened every five years. When the Congress was not in session, the Central Committee was the highest body, but because the Central Committee met twice a year, most duties and responsibilities were vested in the Politburo. The party leader held the office of First Secretary who served as the head of government.

Like all other CPSU republican branches, the CPU was committed, in accordance to the party statute, to adherence to Marxist–Leninist ideology based on the writings of Vladimir Lenin and Karl Marx, and formalized under Joseph Stalin. The party had pursued state socialism, under which all industries were nationalized and a command economy was introduced. Prior to the adoption of central planning in 1929, Lenin had introduced a mixed economy, commonly referred to as the New Economic Policy, in the 1920s, which allowed to introduce certain capitalist elements in the Soviet economy. This lasted until 26 August 1991 when the Verkhovna Rada (Ukrainian parliament) suspended and on 30 August 1991 prohibited the Communist Party of Ukraine based on the fact that "the leadership of the Communist Party of Ukraine in its actions supported the coup d'état" [in Moscow].From the parliamentary faction of the Communist Party, following its 1991 prohibition, there was created the Socialist Party of Ukraine. On efforts of some other communist cells across Ukraine that did not join the Socialist Party, in 1993 in Donetsk was re-established the Communist Party of Ukraine as a political party of independent Ukraine, while joining the Union of Communist Parties – Communist Party of the Soviet Union out of Moscow. Some members who joined Socialist Party, after re-establishing of the Communist Party, joined the new political entity among whom the most notable was Adam Martyniuk.

Following sanctions against the party in 1991, the party fell apart in a similar way to its parent organization (the Communist Party of the Soviet Union) having members of such main deviations like Democratic Platform and Interregional Deputy group reorganized into separate political entities. The ban lasted until 2001 and in May 2002, the older party was merged into the 1993 CPU.

Historical overview

Russian Bolsheviks in Ukraine
The party traces its beginning to committees and party's cells of the Russian Social Democratic Labour Party (RSDLP) that existed at the end of the 19th century in all bigger cities and industrial centers on Ukrainian territory which was part of the Russian Empire. Under influence from the League of Struggle for the Emancipation of the Working Class in Saint Petersburg, in 1897 such organization was also formed in Kyiv and Yekaterinoslav which also were taking part in preparation and convocation of the 1st Congress of the Russian Social Democratic Labour Party in 1898. With release of newspaper Iskra in December 1900 in Germany, on territory of Ukraine spread out a network of the Lenin's Iskra group and organizations. Among the most notable activists in Ukraine during that period were Ivan Babushkin, Rosalia Zemlyachka, Pyotr Krasikov, Isaak Lalayants, Friedrichs Lengniks, Maxim Litvinov, Grigory Petrovsky, Mykola Skrypnyk (Nikolay Skripnik), Dmitry Ulyanov, Vasiliy Shelgunov, Alexander Schlichter, Alexander Tsiurupa, and others. Following the 2nd Congress of the Russian Social Democratic Labour Party (1903) in social-democratic organizations has developed a struggle between Mensheviks and Bolsheviks. On behalf of Vladimir Lenin, in 1904 Vatslav Vorovsky with Lalayants and Levitskiy created in Odessa the Southern Bureau of the RSDLP that led activities of Odessa, Yekaterinoslav, Nikolayev committees, brought together around itself Bolshevik organizations of the South, conducted great deal of work in preparation to the 3rd Congress of the Russian Social Democratic Labour Party in 1905.

During the 1905 Russian Revolution Bolsheviks in Ukraine guided by decisions of the 3rd Congress led working people to fight against autocracy. In more than 50 cities and settlements were created Soviets of working deputies. In December 1905 Bolsheviks led number of armed uprisings in Ukraine, among which were in Horlivka, Alexandrovsk (Zaporizhia), Kharkiv. Kyiv, Mykolaiv and many other cities were covered with strike action. In course of the revolution the RSDLP organizations in Ukraine grew significantly and in 1907 they were accounted for over 20,000 men. Organizers and leaders
of party's activities during this time were Comrade Artyom (Fyodor Sergeev), Vladimir Bonch-Bruyevich, Miron Vladimirov, Kliment Voroshilov, Serafima Gopner, Sergey Gusev, Lidia Knipovich, Gleb Krzhizhanovsky, Grigory Petrovsky, Nikolay Skripnik, Alexander Schlichter, Yemelyan Yaroslavsky, and others. During the following year of government reaction in 1907–10 Bolshevik organizations in Ukraine have suffered significant losses, yet continued their revolutionary activities. Guided by decisions of the 1912 Prague Conference, those Bolsheviks carried out work to expand and strengthen ties with the masses, their international upbringing, preparing workers to new revolutionary battles, were exposing supporters of what was labeled as "liquidationism", "otzovizm" (recalling representatives from the State Duma), trotskyism and bourgeois nationalism. During the years of World War I (1914–18) the Bolsheviks of Ukraine propagated the Lenin's slogan of transforming the imperialist war into a civil war and fought against social chauvinism and revolutionary defeatism.

Bolshevik Baltin in the "Chronicle of the Revolution" noted that during the World War I in December 1914 Kharkiv experienced the most eerie Russian chauvinism (see, Great Russian chauvinism) which knew no limits when Russian ultra-nationalist Black Hundreds were assisted by a local police. Baltin also stated that at that time the Kharkiv Locomotive Factory (employing 6,000 workers) was considered a "citadel of revolutionary movement" yet due to pressure of the local police and the Russian nationalists the revolutionary life was completely suppressed. In January 1915 the Kharkiv Bolshevik organization was accounted of no more than 10 people. The Bolshevik organization in Kharkiv was revived after arrival of Aleksei Medvedev, Nikolay Lyakhin (Petrograd Bolsheviks) and Maksimov and Maria Skobeeva (Moscow Bolsheviks). Following the Russian defeat during Gorlice–Tarnów Offensive and start of the Great Retreat, to Kharkiv from Riga was evacuated a plant of the Public Company of Electricity with 4,000 workers.

During the 1917 February Revolution, known as the February bourgeois democratic revolution in communist jargon, the Bolshevik organizations guided by the Central Committee of the Russian Social Democratic Labour Party claimed that they led the struggle of the working people against Russian autocracy, and after overthrowing it launched a struggle for the masses against whom communists named as conciliators and bourgeois nationalists. The process of differentiation of the Bolsheviks and the Mensheviks in the joint organizations of the RSDLP intensified and as well as the process of creation of independent Bolshevik organizations that in July 1917 accounted for around 33,000 men.

According to Yevgenia Bosch, the Kyiv party organization after the February Revolution accounted for only near 200 members and it mainly was concentrated on elections to the Soviet of Workers' Deputies. The performance of the party organization was far from stellar and huge advantage in the soviet (council) was secured by what Bosch called "petty bourgeois parties". The majority in the soviet was formed by Mensheviks. The soviet's executive committee (ispolkom) was also dominated by Mensheviks and Bundists, while Bolsheviks managed to have own representative Maks Savelyev. The Kyiv party organization chose not to participate in elections to the Soviet of Soldiers' Deputies due to lack of relations with local military. The most important role for the organization was participation in the 1 May street demonstration to the point that the Bolsheviks decided to conducted own one in spite that the event was already organized by the Soviet of Workers' Deputies.

Unlike any other Bolshevik organizations in Ukraine that adopted the Lenin's April Theses without discussions, on 23 April 1917 the Kyiv party cell approved resolution in which it called the April Theses "yet insufficiently substantiated and developed". On 28 April 1917 at the city's assembly Bolsheviks stated that those theses require further discussion and promised to publish them in their newspaper. They never did. At the 7th All-Russian conference of Bolsheviks where the theses were adopted practically unanimously, the Kyiv Bolsheviks, led by Yurii Pyatakov and who had other thought, did not dare to oppose Vladimir Lenin.

Struggle for establishment of the Soviet power in Ukraine
Following the "July Days" and the semi-legal 6th Congress of the Russian Social Democratic Labour Party, Bolsheviks of Ukraine began to prepare the workers for an armed uprising "for Soviet power". Big help was provided to them by the Central Committee of the RSDLP(b) that maintained connection with more than 50 of its party organizations in Ukraine. Active role in the preparation process of the masses to the "Socialist Revolution" (October Revolution) was conducted by Vasiliy Averin, Yevgenia Bosch, Kliment Voroshilov, Yan Gamarnik, Serafima Gopner, Vladimir Zatonsky, Andrei Ivanov, Emanuel Kviring, Yuriy Kotsiubynsky, Dmitriy Lebed, Grigory Petrovsky, Vitaly Primakov, Fyodor Sergeyev, and others. During the summer of 1917 on territory of modern Ukraine were formed two regional (oblast) branches of the RSDLP(b) of Southwestern Krai and Donets-Krivoi Rog Basin and later in the fall the bureau of the RSDLP(b) military organizations of the Southwestern Front (due to ongoing World War I). According to Yevgenia Bosch, the regional branch of the RSDLP(b) was supposed to consist of 7 guberniyas (Governorates): Kyiv, Chernihiv, Podolia, Volhynia, Poltava, Kherson, and Yekaterinoslav. Also membership of the party in Ukraine grew significantly in 1917 from 7,000 in April to 50,000 in October. Following the October Revolution in Petrograd, at the 2nd All-Russian Congress of Soviets among its delegates, there were 65 Bolsheviks from Ukraine.

The very next day after the October Revolution, on 8–13 November (26–31 October by old style), 1917 Bolsheviks in Kyiv, who have been headquartered at the Mariinskyi Palace, attempted to secure power in Kyiv with less success and, after the Bolshevik's victory over the Kyiv Military District garrison, the authority in Kyiv was secured by the Regional Committee in Protection of Revolution in Ukraine where important role played the Central Council of Ukraine. In a week the Central Council adopted its "Third Universal" where it condemned the Bolshevik coup-d'état and declared Ukraine in federative union with the Russian Republic (instead of the Soviet Russia). In response to that on 26 November 1917 the Bolshevik Sovnarkom published its manifesto to the all population "About struggle with counter-revolutionary insurgency of Kaledin, Kornilov, Dutov, and supported by the Central Rada (О борьбе с контрреволюционным восстанием Каледина, Корнилова, Дутова, поддерживаемым Центральной Радой)".

Communist Party of Ukraine

The Communist Party (Bolsheviks) of Ukraine was created on 5–12 July 1918 in Moscow during the 1st Party Congress. Decisive factor of establishing autonomous branch were conditions of the Treaty of Brest-Litovsk according to which Ukraine was leaving the Russian Federation. During the congress there was established a central committee of 15 members and 6 candidates to membership: Ivan Amosov, Andrei Bubnov, Afanasi Butsenko, Shulim Gruzman, Vladimir Zatonski, Lavreti Kartvelishvili, Emmanuel Kviring, Stanisław Kosior, Isaak Kreisberg, Iuri Lutovinov, Georgi Piatakov, Rafail Farbman, Pinkhus Rovner, Leonid Tarski, Isaak Shvarts; Ian Gamarnik, Dmitri Lebed, Mikhail Maiorov, Nikolai Skrypnik, Petr Slynko, Iakov, Iakovlev. Upon creation of the party there were two points of view on the party's structure and relationship with the Russian Communist Party: one idea proposed by the Kiev faction leader Nikolay Skripnik included relationship with the Russian Communist Party through Comintern, while the other one proposed by the Yekaterinoslav and Donbas leader Emmanuel Kviring included relationship with the Central Committee of the Russian Communist Party.

Most of its constituent members were former members of the Russian Bolsheviks who in 1917 pronounced themselves "RSDRP(b) – Social-Democracy of Ukraine" and with the help of the Antonov-Ovseyenko expeditionary forces of Petrograd and Moscow Red Guards instigated a civil war in Ukraine by routing local Red Guards. Number of Ukrainian politicians from left faction of the Ukrainian Social Democratic Labour Party (also known as Left Ukrainian Social Democrats or unofficially as "Ukrainian Bolsheviks") joined the Bolsheviks in January 1918.

After the signing of the Treaty of Brest-Litovsk the Bolshevik faction Social-Democracy of Ukraine was forced to dissolve as all Bolsheviks were forced out of Ukraine.

During the First Five-Year Plan, the Party took direct responsibility for collectivization of agricultural land and eventually in forced requisitions of grain that led to the Holodomor.

On 13 October 1952 the party officially was renamed as the Communist Party of Ukraine. On October 24, 1990, article 6 on the monopoly of the Communist Party of Ukraine on power was excluded from the Constitution of the Ukrainian SSR.

On 30 August 1991 the Communist Party was outlawed in Ukraine. Different sectors reconstituted themselves in different parties. One group led by moderate members under Oleksandr Moroz formed the Socialist Party of Ukraine (SPU) out of most of the former members, a group of agrarians led by Serhiy Dovhan and Oleksandr Tkachenko formed the Peasant Party of Ukraine (SelPU), and another group, the Communist Party of Ukraine, was re-created in 1993 in Donetsk under the leadership of Petro Symonenko when the ban was lifted. The remaining members either changed political direction or created their own left-wing parties such as the Vitrenko bloc, Social-Democratic (United) party, and others.

Organizational structure

Central Committees
Initial composition of the committee was elected at the 1st party Congress on 12 July 1918 and consisted of the following people: Ivan Amosov, Andrei Bubnov, Afanasiy Butsenko, Shulim Gruzman, Vladimir Zatonsky, Lavrentiy Kartvelishvili, Emmanuil Kviring, Stanislav Kosior, Isaak Kreisberg, Yuriy Lutovinov, Yuriy Pyatakov, Rafail Farbman, Pinkhus Rovner, Leonid Tarsky (Sokolovsky), Isaak Shvarts. Beside full members there also were candidate to the committee. The initial composition included Yan Hamarnik (Yakov Pudikovich), Dmitriy Lebed, Mikhail Mayorov (Meyer Biberman), Mykola Skrypnyk, Petro Slynko, Yakov Yakovlev (Epshtein). On 9 September 1918 Mayorov and Slynko replaced Kertvelishvili and Farbman as full members, while the last two lost their membership.
During World War II on 2 October 1942 there was created the Illegal Central Committee of the Party consisting of 17 members. The committee was dissolved on 29 June 1943. Among the members of the committee were such personalities as Sydir Kovpak, Leonid Korniets, Oleksiy Fedorov, and others.

Politburo
The party  had its own Politburo  created on 6 March 1919. On 25 September 1952 the committee was renamed into the Bureau of the Central Committee (CC) of CP(b)U, and in October the same year as the Bureau of the CC CPU. On 10 October 1952 it became the Presidium of the CC CPU. On 26 June 1966 again the bureau was finally left with its original name as the Politburo of the CC CPU.
At first it consisted of five members and later another one was added. The first Politburo included Andriy Bubnov, Emanuel Kviring, Vladimir Mescheryakov, Georgiy Pyatakov, Christian Rakovsky, and later Stanislav Kosior, all centrists.
From 23 March until 15 April 1920 there was elected a Provisional Bureau which the next day was ratified by the Russian Communist Party (Bolsheviks).

Orgburo
Along with Politburo the party like its Russian counterpart had its own Orgburo that was created the same day as Politburo.

Party leader

The party was headed by its secretary. The position was highly influential and often was considered to be more important than the head of state (see Ukrainian SSR).

The following list is composed of the secretary of the Central Committee of the party who were the leaders of the Party. The position also was changing names between being called the First Secretary or the General Secretary, depending on a political atmosphere in the Soviet Union. The position was not officially of the head of state, but certainly was very influential, especially within the republic. The longest serving secretary was Vladimir Shcherbitsky with some 17 years as the head of the Communist Party, the second best is split between Stanislav Kosior and Nikita Khrushchev, both of which have 11 years.

Party Congresses
There were 28 Congresses with the last one consisting out of two stages. There also were three consolidated conferences of the party from 1926 to 1932. At the second stage of the last Congress there were 273 members in the Central Committee.

First Congress, July 1918
This took place in Moscow and decided to call for preparations for an armed uprising against the occupying Central Powers forces and Hetman Pavlo Skoropadskyi’s dictatorship. There were only 15 members in the Central Committee and six candidates. It reversed the decision adopted that April by a preliminary council in Tahanroh to established an independent Ukrainian bolshevik party with a membership in the envisaged Third International apart from the Russian party.

Central Committee
Ivan Amosov, Andrei Bubnov, Afanasiy Butsenko, Shulim Gruzman, Vladimir Zatonsky, Lavrentiy Kartvelishvili (excl.), Emmanuil Kviring, Stanislaw Kosior, Isaak Kreisberg, Yuriy Lutovinov, Georgiy Pyatakov, Rafail Farbman (excl.), Pinkhus Rovner, Leonid Tarskiy (Sokolovsky), Isaak Shvarts.
Promoted to members: Mikhail Mayorov (Meyer Biberman) and Pyotr Slinko.

Second Congress, October 1918
This also took place in Moscow. Joseph Stalin was elected to the Central Committee.

Central Committee
Artyom (Fyodor Sergeyev), Nikolai Beschetvertnoi, Shulim Gruzman

Third Congress, March 1919
This congress took place in Kharkov. A new central committee with a majority of Left Communists was elected. This prompted the Eight Congress of the Russian Communist Party to pass the following motion: "It is necessary to have a unified communist party with a unified central committee ... All decisions of the RCP and its leading organs are absolutely binding for all parts of the party, independent of their national composition. The central committees of the Ukrainian, Lettish and Lithuanian communists are conferred the rights of regional committees of the party; they are to be unreservedly subordinate to the central committee of the RCP."

Fourth Congress, 17–23 March 1920
The Borotbists were forced to dissolve themselves and their erstwhile members were permitted to join the CP(b)U. Vasyl Ellan-Blakytny and Shumsky drawn from the Borotbist leadership were elected to the Committee and the Borotbist Central Committee passed a resolution dissolving the Borotbist party and its central committee. All members were instructed to apply for CP(B)U membership. Nearly 4,000 out of approximately 5,000 Borotbists  were admitted to the CP(B)U.

Later congresses
From 1919 to 1934 all meetings were conducted in Kharkiv, capital of the Ukrainian SSR.
There were three major Committees and several Bureaus. Each committee had members and candidates to members each with certain degree of obligations. The members and candidates to the committees were elected at the Party Congress. The number of members varied from one gathering to the next usually in ascending sequence. During the Great Purge the numbers remarkably declined as well as one of the committees, Central Control Committee, was disbanded. The first members were elected in 1918, 15 members of the Central Committee, six candidates as well as three members and two candidates of the Revision Committee. In 1920 the Central Control Committee was formed and by 1934 the Party accounted for some 191 members and 45 candidates in all committees. In 1937 there were only 71 members and 40 candidates in two committees. By 1990 the number of members grew just over 300 members.

List of the party congresses and conferences (on equal rights as congresses) 

 1st Congress of the Communist Party (Bolsheviks) of Ukraine — Moscow, 5—12 July 1918
 2nd Congress of the Communist Party (Bolsheviks) of Ukraine — Moscow, 17—22 October 1918
 3rd Congress of the Communist Party (Bolsheviks) of Ukraine — Kharkiv, 1—6 March 1919
 4th Conference of the Communist Party (Bolsheviks) of Ukraine — Kharkiv, 17—23 March 1920
 5th Conference of the Communist Party (Bolsheviks) of Ukraine — Kharkiv, 17—22 November 1920
 6th All-Ukrainian Conference of the Communist Party (Bolsheviks) of Ukraine — Kharkiv, 9—14 December 1921
 7th All-Ukrainian Conference of the Communist Party (Bolsheviks) of Ukraine — Kharkiv, 6—10 April 1923
 8th All-Ukrainian Conference of the Communist Party (Bolsheviks) of Ukraine — Kharkiv, 12—16 May 1924
 9th Congress of the Communist Party (Bolsheviks) of Ukraine — Kharkiv, 6—12 December 1925
 10th Congress of the Communist Party (Bolsheviks) of Ukraine — Kharkiv, 20—29 November 1927
 11th Congress of the Communist Party (Bolsheviks) of Ukraine — Kharkiv, 5—15 June 1930
 12th Congress of the Communist Party (Bolsheviks) of Ukraine — Kharkiv, 18—23 January 1934
 13th Congress of the Communist Party (Bolsheviks) of Ukraine — Kyiv, 27 May — 3 June 1937
 14th Congress of the Communist Party (Bolsheviks) of Ukraine — Kyiv, 13—18 June 1938
 15th Congress of the Communist Party (Bolsheviks) of Ukraine — Kyiv, 13—17 May 1940
 16th Congress of the Communist Party (Bolsheviks) of Ukraine — Kyiv, 25—28 January 1949
 17th Congress of the Communist Party (Bolsheviks) of Ukraine — Kyiv, 23—27 September 1952
 18th Congress of the Communist Party of Ukraine — Kyiv, 23—26 March 1954
 19th Congress of the Communist Party of Ukraine — Kyiv, 17—21 January 1956
 20th Extraordinary Congress of the Communist Party of Ukraine — Kyiv, 16—17 January 1959
 21st Congress of the Communist Party of Ukraine — Kyiv, 16—19 February 1960
 22nd Congress of the Communist Party of Ukraine — Kyiv, 27—30 September 1961
 23rd Congress of the Communist Party of Ukraine — Kyiv, 15—18 March 1966
 24th Congress of the Communist Party of Ukraine — Kyiv, 17—20 March 1971
 25th Congress of the Communist Party of Ukraine — Kyiv, 10—13 February 1976
 26th Congress of the Communist Party of Ukraine — Kyiv, 10—12 February 1981
 27th Congress of the Communist Party of Ukraine — Kyiv, 6—8 February 1986
 28th Congress of the Communist Party of Ukraine — Kyiv, 19—23 June 1990 (first stage), 13—14 December 1990 (second stage)

Party headquarters

Party newspapers

Central newspapers
 Pravda Ukrainy (Sovetskaya Ukraina 1938–1943, Pravda Ukrainy 1944–1991), Russian language newspaper
 Radyanska Ukrayina (Kommunist 1918–1926, Komunist 1926–1943, Radyanska Ukrayina 1944–1991), Ukrainian language newspaper
 Silski Visti (1920–1991)
 Ukrayina Moloda (1991)

Regional newspapers
 Bilshovyk Poltavshchyny (1917-1941)

See also
 First Secretary of the Communist Party of Ukraine
 Handbook on history of the Communist Party and the Soviet Union 1898–1991
 Institute of History of the Party
 All-Ukrainian Congress of Soviets

Notes

References

Further reading

J. Borys (1980). The Sovietization of Ukraine 1917-1923: the Communist doctrine and practice of national self-determination, rev edn (Edmonton 1980)
Krawchenko, B. (ed). Ukraine after Shelest (Edmonton 1983)
Lewytzkyj, B. Politics and Society in Soviet Ukraine, 1953–1980 (Edmonton 1984)
Kuzio, T. Ukraine: Perestroika to Independence, (Edmonton 1994; 2nd edn New York 2000)
A. Adams (1963). Bolsheviks in the Ukraine
Bosch, Yevgenia (2015). The year of struggle: struggle for power in Ukraine from April of 1917 to the German occupation (Год борьбы: борьба за власть на Украине с апреля 1917 г. до немецкой оккупации). "DirectMEDIA". Moscow-Berlin  
Savchenko, Viktor (2006). Twelve wars for Ukraine. (Двенадцать войн за Украину). "Folio". Kharkiv, 2006. 
In the Central Committee of the Communist Party of the Ukraine // The Soviet Multinational State. Edited ByMartha B. Olcott, Lubomyr Hajda, Anthony Olcott. Routledge, 1990.

External links
 Dmitricheva, O., Rakhmanin, S. Ukraine partisan. Part IV. Communist. Mirror Weekly. 1 March 2002.
 Shurkhalo, D. How 100 years ago in Moscow was created the CP(b)U (Як 100 років тому у Москві створили КП(б)У). Radio Liberty. 12 August 2018
 Personnel composition of the Central Committee of the Communist Party (Bolsheviks) – Communist Party of Ukraine (Персональный состав Центрального комитета КП(б) - КП Украины). Handbook on history of the Communist Party and the Soviet Union 1898–1991 (www.knowbysight.info).
 Communist Party of Ukraine. Encyclopedia of Ukraine. (in English)
 Project: According to the decision of the Central Committee of the Communist Party of Ukraine. Ukraine SIG (www.jewishgen.org).

 
Ukraine
Communist parties in the Soviet Union
Banned communist parties in Ukraine
Political parties of the Russian Revolution
Russian Revolution in Ukraine
Parties of one-party systems
Ukrainian Soviet Socialist Republic
Political parties established in 1918
Political parties disestablished in 1991
1918 establishments in Russia
1991 disestablishments in Ukraine
Parliamentary groups in Ukraine